Douglas Winston (16 December 1932 – 23 May 2021) was an Australian sprinter who competed in the 1956 Summer Olympics.

References

1932 births
2021 deaths
Australian male sprinters
Olympic athletes of Australia
Athletes (track and field) at the 1956 Summer Olympics